Diego Folgar Toimil (born 6 January 1983), commonly known as Dieguito, is a Spanish professional footballer who is currently a free agent. Dieguito also occasionally plays as winger.

Dieguito spent his time mostly at the lower-tier divisions in Spain before continuing his career in Hong Kong.

Club career

Career in Spain
Dieguito started his professional career at 18 years old with Real Oviedo B in Segunda División B. He made his professional debut on 4 November 2011 against Sporting de Gijón B, being substituted 2 minutes before the end of match. He concluded the season with 4 appearances, but the club was relegated after the season.

Dieguito continued his football career at the fourth-tier Tercera División and fifth-tier Divisiones Regionales de Fútbol in Spain after spending a season in Segunda División B. He spent a total of 10 seasons in these division, and played for 9 clubs during the period.

Southern
Dieguito joined newly promoted Hong Kong First Division League club Southern District RSA. He made his debut for the club on 1 September 2012 against Biu Chun Rangers. He scored in the 1st minute but the club lost 1–3 eventually.

In the 2013–14 season, he was assigned squad number 10, after teammate Lam Ho Kwan changed to 2. Dieguito wore number 9 in the previous season.

Club statistics

References

External links
 
 
 Match-endirect Profile
 Futbolme Profile  

1983 births
Living people
Footballers from Vigo
Spanish footballers
Association football forwards
Segunda División B players
Tercera División players
Real Oviedo Vetusta players
Villarreal CF B players
Hong Kong First Division League
Spanish expatriate footballers
Southern District FC players
Expatriate footballers in Hong Kong
CD Torrevieja players
Hong Kong League XI representative players